Svetlanov (Russian: Светланов) is a Russian male surname, its feminine counterpart is Svetlanova (Russian: Светланова). It may refer to:

Yevgeny Svetlanov (1928–2002), Russian conductor and composer
4135 Svetlanov, asteroid named after Yevgeny Svetlanov
Svetlanov Symphony Orchestra
Nina Svetlanova (born 1932), Russian-American pianist and educator

Russian-language surnames